Platypleura poorvachala is a species of cicada described from the Eastern Ghats of Peninsular India. It was described in 2017 on the basis of specimens obtained in scrub forest near Nagalapuram in Chittoor District.

References 

poorvachala